Maithaanam is a 2011 Indian Tamil-language film written and directed by M. S. Shakthivel, starring four assistant directors, M. A. Kennedy, Suresh Guru, Jyothi Raj and Sekhar. The film released on 20 May 2011. Upon release, Maithaanam received rave reviews, and was screened at the 2011 Chennai International Film Festival and the 2011 Dubai International Film Festival.

Cast
 M. A. Kennedy as Suri
 Suresh Guru as Sukumar
 Jyothi Raj as Logu
 Sekhar as Siva
 Swasika as Shanthi

References

External links
 

2011 films
2010s Tamil-language films